is a dam in Tenryū, Nagano Prefecture, Japan, completed in 1951. It is located on the Tenryū River upstream from the Sakuma Dam.

During the Second World War prisoners of war held at Tokyo #2D (Mitsushima) Prisoner of War Camp provided labour to build the penstock tunnel to the powerstation, collect aggregate, and mix cement for the construction of the dam between November 1942 and August 1945. Fifty seven prisoners died from diseases relating to poor sanitary, diet, and climate conditions.

See also

 List of dams and reservoirs in Japan

References

Dams in Nagano Prefecture
Dams completed in 1951
Gravity dams